Centripetal usually refers to centripetal force, a force that keeps a body on a curved path.

It may also refer to:
Centripetal acceleration
Centripetal Catmull–Rom spline (computer graphics)
Centripetal harmony
Centripetal obesity
Centripetal Spring Armchair
Centripetal structure (theoretical linguistics) – see Lucien Tesnière

See also
Centrifugal (disambiguation)
History of centrifugal and centripetal forces